Ameen Khosravian (Persian: امین خسرویان born 6 February 1989) is an Iranian American professional basketball player, and founder of Pirouzi Athletics.

References 
 http://basketball.usbasket.com/player/Ameen_Khosravian/364654
 https://basketball.usbasket.com/team/Baltimore_Hawks/19671?Page=4
http://www.maxpreps.com/m/career/default.aspx?careerid=4646b140-eff4-e211-99e4-002655e6c126
https://pirouziofficial.com/pages/about-us
http://sportspagereplay.com/sports-equipment/iranian-professional-athlete-launches-sports-apparel-brand-in-baltimore-maryland/
https://www.eurobasket.com/Armenia/news/646536/Eurobasket-Brings-60+-American-Free-Agents-to-Europe-for-International-Tournament
https://www.asia-basket.com/Iran/basketball-Players-Abroad.aspx?Year=2015
https://www.asia-basket.com/Iran/basketball-Players-Abroad.aspx?Year=2017

1989 births
Living people
American men's basketball players
American people of Iranian descent
Sportspeople of Iranian descent
Guards (basketball)
Iranian men's basketball players
Sportspeople from Maryland
Basketball players from Maryland
Basketball players from Los Angeles